The 2012 North Carolina State Senate elections selected members to serve in the North Carolina Senate for a two-year term commencing in January 2013. Going into the election, the Senate had 31 Republican and 19 Democratic members, which constituted a two-thirds super-majority for the Republican Party. Following the election, the Senate had 33 Republican and 17 Democratic members.

Results Summary

Incumbents defeated in primary election
Chris Carney (R-District 44), defeated by David L. Curtis (R)

Incumbents defeated in general election
Stan M. White (D-District 1), defeated by Bill Cook (R)
Doug Berger (D-District 18), defeated by Chad Barefoot (R)

Open seats that changed parties
Don Vaughan (D-District 27) did not seek re-election, seat won by Trudy Wade (R)

Newly created seats
District 5, won by Donald G. Davis (D)
District 22, won by Mike Woodard (D)
District 41, won by Jeff Tarte (R)

Seats eliminated by redistricting
Bob Atwater (D-District 18) did not seek re-election after his seat was merged with 23rd district
Harris Blake (R-District 22) did not seek re-election after his seat was merged with the 29th district
Wes Westmoreland (R-District 46) did not seek re-election after his seat was merged with the 44th district

Detailed Results

Districts 1-25

District 1
Incumbent Democrat Stan M. White has represented the 1st district since 2011.

District 2
Incumbent Republican Jean R. Preston has represented the 2nd district since 2007. Preston did not seek re-election. Representative Norman Sanderson won the open seat.

District 3
Incumbent Democrat Clark Jenkins has represented the 3rd district since 2003.

District 4
Incumbent Democrat Ed Jones has represented the 4th district since 2007.

District 5
The 5th district is an open seat that includes Democratic leaning areas in Greene, Pitt, Lenoir, and Wayne counties. Democrat Donald G. Davis who represented a different version of the 5th district from 2009 to 2011 won the open seat.

District 6
Incumbent Republican Majority Leader Harry Brown has represented the 6th district since 2004.

District 7
The new 7th district is the successor to the old 5th district, but it has been drawn to be more Republican leaning than its predecessor. It now includes mostly Republican leaning areas in Pitt, Lenoir, and Wayne counties.  Incumbent Republican Louis Pate, who has represented the 5th district since 2011, successfully sought re-election here.

District 8
Incumbent Republican Bill Rabon has represented the 8th district since 2011.

District 9
Incumbent Republican Thom Goolsby has represented the 9th district since 2011.

District 10
Incumbent Republican Brent Jackson has represented the 10th district since 2011.

District 11
Incumbent Republican Buck Newton has represented the 11th district since 2011.

District 12
The new 12th district is considerably different from its predecessor. Redistricting resulted in it losing its share of Wayne County and most of Johnston County, except for a small section in the western corner where Rouzer's home is located. The new district now includes all of Harnett and Lee counties. Incumbent Republican David Rouzer, who has represented the 12th district since 2009, did not seek re-election. Rouzer instead ran for U.S House District 7. Republican Ronald J. Rabin won the open seat.

District 13
Incumbent Democrat Michael P. Walters has represented the 13th district since 2009. The new 13th district lost its share of Hoke County, but now includes Columbus County.

District 14
Incumbent Democrat Dan Blue has represented the 14th district since 2009.

District 15
Incumbent Republican Neal Hunt has represented the 15th district since 2005.

District 16
Incumbent Democrat Josh Stein has represented the 16th district since 2009.

District 17
Incumbent Republican Richard Stevens has represented the 17th district since 2003. Stevens did not seek re-election.

District 18
The new 18th district is essentially a new district, including constituents in eastern Wake County and also includes all of Franklin County. Democrat Doug Berger, who has represented 7th district since 2005, had most of his constituents drawn into the 4th and 20th districts, but he sought re-election here where is home was located.  The district was expected to favor Republicans and, as expected, Berger lost re-election to Republican opponent Chad Barefoot.

District 19
Incumbent Republican Wesley Meredith has represented the 19th district since 2011. The new 19th district lost its share of Bladen County and traded Democratic leaning areas with Republican leaning areas to the 21st district in Cumberland County. The gerrymandered district was designed to protect the incumbent Meredith.

District 20
Incumbent Democrat Floyd McKissick Jr. has represented the 20th district since 2007.

District 21
Incumbent Democrat Eric L. Mansfield has represented the 21st district since 2011. The new district was made heavily Democratic by gaining Hoke County and losing Republican leaning areas in Cumberland County to the 19th district. Mansfield did not seek re-election, instead he ran Lieutenant Governor. Democrat Ben Clark won the open seat.

District 22
The new 22nd district is a newly created constituency with no incumbent. The new district includes all of Caswell and Person counties as well as parts of Durham County, though most of the city of Durham remains in the heavily Democratic 20th district. Democrat Mike Woodard won the open seat.

District 23
The new 23rd district loses its share of Person County and gains Chatham County. Incumbent Democrats Eleanor Kinnaird, who has represented the 23rd district and its predecessors since 1997, and Bob Atwater, who has represented the 18th district since 2005, were both redistricted here. Atwater retired and Kinnaird ran for re-election.

District 24
Incumbent Republican Rick Gunn has represented the 24th district since 2011.

District 25
Incumbent Democrat Bill Purcell has represented the 25th district and its predecessors since 1997. Purcell did not seek re-election. Gene McLaurin won the open seat.

Districts 26-50

District 26
Incumbent Republican President Pro Tempore Phil Berger has represented the 26th district since and its predecessors since 2001.

District 27
The new 27th district is still based in Guilford County but has been drawn to be more Republican than its predecessor. Incumbent Republican Don Vaughan has represented the 27th district since 2009. Vaughan did not seek re-election.

District 28
Incumbent Democrat Gladys Robinson has represented the 28th district since 2011.

District 29
The new 29th district lost its share of Montgomery County and the eastern half of Randolph County. It gained all of Moore County. Incumbent Republicans Jerry Tillman, who has represented the 29th district since 2003, and Harris Blake, who has represented the 22nd district since 2003, were both redistricted here. Blake retired and Tillman was successfully re-elected here.

District 30
Incumbent Republican Don East has represented the 30th district since 2005. East died before the election, so all votes cast for him were given to Shirley B. Randleman who took the seat at the beginning of the 2013-2014 session.

District 31
Incumbent Republican Pete Brunstetter has represented the 31st district since 2006.

District 32
Incumbent Democrat Linda Garrou has represented the 32nd district and its predecessors since 1999. Garrou did not seek re-election. Representative Earline Parmon won the open seat.

District 33
The new 33rd district gained Montgomery County. Incumbent Republican Stan Bingham has represented the 33rd district and its predecessors since 2001.

District 34
Incumbent Republican Andrew Brock has represented the 34th district since 2003.

District 35
Incumbent Republican Tommy Tucker has represented the 35th district since 2011.

District 36
Incumbent Republican Fletcher L. Hartsell Jr. has represented the 36th district and its predecessors since 1991.

District 37
Incumbent Democrat Dan Clodfelter has represented the 37th district and its predecessors since 1999.

District 38
Incumbent Democrat Charlie Smith Dannelly has represented the 38th district and its predecessors since 1995. Dannelly initially ran for re-election but later withdrew. Democrat Joel Ford won the open seat.

District 39
Incumbent Republican Bob Rucho has represented the 39th district and its predecessors since 2008 and previously from 1997 to 2005.

District 40
Incumbent Democrat Maclom Graham has represented the 40th district since 2005.

District 41
The new 41st district is based in Mecklenburg County and includes Republican leaning areas in the Northern and Southeastern sections of the county connected by a narrow strip of land that runs along the county's border with Cabarrus County. The district, which has now incumbent, is expected to favor Republicans. Republican Jeff Tarte won the open seat.

District 42
Incumbent Republican Austin Allran has represented the 42nd district and its predecessors since 1986.

District 43
Incumbent Republican Kathy Harrington has represented the 43rd district since 2011.

District 44
The new 44th district overlaps with much of the former 41st district represented by Republican Chris Carney since December 20, 2011. Carney sought re-election here but was defeated in the Republican primary by David L. Curtis. Curtis won the general election.

District 45
Incumbent Republican Dan Soucek has represented the 45th district since 2011.

District 46
The new 46th district lost its share Caldwell County but gained Cleveland County. Incumbent Republicans Wes Westmoreland, who has represented the 46th district since 2012 and Warren Daniel, who has represented the 44th district since 2011 were both redistricted here. Westmoreland did not seek re-election and Daniel successfully sought re-election here.

District 47
The new 48th district lost its share of Haywood and Avery counties but gained all of Polk and Rutherford counties. Incumbent Republican Ralph Hise has represented the 47th district since 2011.

District 48
The new 48th District lost Polk County but gained Transylvania County. Incumbent Republican Tom Apodaca has represented the 48th district since 2003.

District 49
Incumbent Democrat Martin Nesbitt has represented the 49th district since 2004.

District 50
The new 50th district lost Transylvania County but gained all of Haywood County. Incumbent Republican Jim Davis has represented the 50th district since 2011.

References
https://er.ncsbe.gov/?election_dt=11/06/2012&county_id=0&office=NCS&contest=0
 North Carolina State Senate elections, 2012 at Ballotpedia

Senate
North Carolina Senate elections
North Carolina Senate